In functional analysis and related areas of mathematics, a set in a topological vector space is called bounded or von Neumann bounded, if every neighborhood of the zero vector can be inflated to include the set. 
A set that is not bounded is called unbounded.

Bounded sets are a natural way to define locally convex polar topologies on the vector spaces in a dual pair, as the polar set of a bounded set is an absolutely convex and absorbing set. 
The concept was first introduced by John von Neumann and Andrey Kolmogorov in 1935.

Definition

Suppose  is a topological vector space (TVS) over a field  

: For every neighborhood  of the origin there exists a real  such that  for all scalars  satisfying  
 This was the definition introduced by John von Neumann in 1935.
 is absorbed by every neighborhood of the origin.
For every neighborhood  of the origin there exists a scalar  such that 
For every neighborhood  of the origin there exists a real  such that  for all scalars  satisfying 
For every neighborhood  of the origin there exists a real  such that  for all real 
Any one of statements (1) through (5) above but with the word "neighborhood" replaced by any of the following: "balanced neighborhood," "open balanced neighborhood," "closed balanced neighborhood," "open neighborhood," "closed neighborhood".
 e.g. Statement (2) may become:  is bounded if and only if  is absorbed by every balanced neighborhood of the origin.
 If  is locally convex then the adjective "convex" may be also be added to any of these 5 replacements.
 This was the definition of "bounded" that Andrey Kolmogorov used in 1934, which is the same as the definition introduced by Stanisław Mazur and Władysław Orlicz in 1933 for metrizable TVS. Kolmogorov used this definition to prove that a TVS is seminormable if and only if it has a bounded convex neighborhood of the origin.

Any one of statements (1) through (5) above but with the neighborhoods limited to those belonging to 
 e.g. Statement (3) may become: For every  there exists a scalar  such that 

If  is a locally convex space whose topology is defined by a family  of continuous seminorms, then this list may be extended to include:
 is bounded for all 
For all   is bounded (according to any defining condition other than this one) in the semi normed space 

 is a norm bounded subset of  By definition, this means that there exists a real number  such that  for all 
 Thus, if  is a linear map between two normed (or seminormed) spaces and if  is the closed (alternatively, open) unit ball in  centered at the origin, then  is a bounded linear operator (which recall means that its operator norm  is finite) if and only if the image  of this ball under  is a norm bounded subset of 
 is a subset of some (open or closed) ball.
 This ball need not be centered at the origin, but its radius must (as usual) be positive and finite.

If  is a vector subspace of the TVS  then this list may be extended to include:
 is contained in the closure of 
 Recall that  is a Hausdorff space if and only if  is closed in  So the only bounded vector subspace of a Hausdorff TVS is 

A subset that is not bounded is called .

Bornology and fundamental systems of bounded sets

The set of all bounded subsets of  trivially forms a fundamental system of bounded sets of

Examples

In any locally convex TVS, the set of closed and bounded disks are a base of bounded set.

Examples and sufficient conditions

Unless indicated otherwise, a topological vector space (TVS) need not be Hausdorff nor locally convex.

Finite sets are bounded.
Every totally bounded subset of a TVS is bounded.
Every relatively compact set in a topological vector space is bounded. If the space is equipped with the weak topology the converse is also true.
The set of points of a Cauchy sequence is bounded, the set of points of a Cauchy net need not be bounded.
The closure of the origin (referring to the closure of the set ) is always a bounded closed vector subspace. This set  is the unique largest (with respect to set inclusion ) bounded vector subspace of  In particular, if  is a bounded subset of  then so is 

Unbounded sets

A set that is not bounded is said to be unbounded.

There exists a Fréchet space  having a bounded subset  and also a dense vector subspace  such that  is  contained in the closure (in ) of any bounded subset of

Stability properties

In any TVS, finite unions, finite Minkowski sums, scalar multiples, translations, subsets, closures, interiors, and balanced hulls of bounded sets are again bounded.
In any locally convex TVS, the convex hull (also called the convex envelope) of a bounded set is again bounded. However, this may be false if the space is not locally convex, as the (non-locally convex) Lp space  spaces for  have no nontrivial open convex subsets.
The image of a bounded set under a continuous linear map is a bounded subset of the codomain.
A subset of an arbitrary (Cartesian) product of TVSs is bounded if and only if its image under every coordinate projections is bounded.
 In other words, a subset  is bounded in  if and only if it is bounded in every (or equivalently, in some) topological vector superspace of

Properties

A locally convex topological vector space has a bounded neighborhood of zero if and only if its topology can be defined by a  seminorm.

The polar of a bounded set is an absolutely convex and absorbing set.

Using the definition of uniformly bounded sets given below, Mackey's countability condition can be restated as: If  are bounded subsets of a metrizable locally convex space then there exists a sequence  of positive real numbers such that  are uniformly bounded. 
In words, given any countable family of bounded sets in a metrizable locally convex space, it is possible to scale each set by its own positive real so that they become uniformly bounded.

Generalizations

Uniformly bounded sets

A family of sets  of subsets of a topological vector space  is said to be  in  if there exists some bounded subset  of  such that 

which happens if and only if its union
 
is a bounded subset of  
In the case of a normed (or seminormed) space, a family  is uniformly bounded if and only if its union  is norm bounded, meaning that there exists some real  such that  for every  or equivalently, if and only if 

 
Assume  is equicontinuous and let  be a neighborhood of the origin in  
Since  is equicontinuous, there exists a neighborhood  of the origin in  such that  for every  
Because  is bounded in  there exists some real  such that if  then  
So for every  and every   which implies that  Thus  is bounded in  Q.E.D.
 

 
Define 
 

It will now be shown that  from which  follows. 
If  then  being bounded guarantees the existence of some positive integer  such that  where the linearity of every  now implies  thus  and hence  as desired. 

Thus 

expresses  as a countable union of closed (in ) sets. 
Since  is a nonmeager subset of itself (as it is a Baire space by the Baire category theorem), this is only possible if there is some integer  such that  has non-empty interior in  
Let  be any point belonging to this open subset of  
Let  be any balanced open neighborhood of the origin in  such that 

The sets  form an increasing (meaning  implies ) cover of the compact space  so there exists some  such that  (and thus ). 
So fix  and  
Let 
 

The convexity of  guarantees  and moreover,  since 
 
Thus  which is a subset of  
Since  is balanced and  we have  which combined with  gives

Finally,  and  imply 
 
as desired. Q.E.D.

Bounded subsets of topological modules

The definition of bounded sets can be generalized to topological modules. 
A subset  of a topological module  over a topological ring  is bounded if for any neighborhood  of  there exists a neighborhood  of  such that

See also

References

Notes

Bibliography

  
  
  
  
  
  
  
  
  
 
  
  
 
  
  

Topological vector spaces